Chah Shureh may refer to:

Chah Shureh-ye Olya
Chah Shureh-ye Sofla
Chah Shureh-ye Vosta